The seventh season of Dance Moms, an American dance reality television created by Collins Avenue Productions, premiered on November 29, 2016, on Lifetime's television network. The season concluded on October 24, 2017. A total of 29 official episodes and 1 special episode (Abby Tells All) aired this season.

Cast
The seventh season features thirteen star billing cast members, with various other dancers and moms appearing throughout the season. Abby Lee Miller left following the first half of the season announcing her exit in a statement on Instagram. Chloe Lukasiak returned to guest star in Season 7B. This is the final season to feature Nia Frazier, Kendall Vertes, Kalani Hilliker, and Brynn Rumfallo as part of the ALDC team.

Choreographers
 Abby Lee Miller
 Gianna Martello
 Laurieann Gibson
 Aisha Francis
 Cheryl Burke

Moms
 Holly Frazier
 Jill Vertes
 Kira Girard
 Ashlee Allen
 Camille Bridges
 Christi Lukasiak
 Stacey Ketchman
 Yolanda Walmsley
 Jamie Caes

Guests
The following pairs list the dancer first and the mom second. 
 Daviana and Fernanda Fletcher
 Jane and Nancy Dickson
 Darrion and Vickie Sellman
 Reagan and Julie Martin

Candy Apples Dance Center
The following pairs list the 
 Vivi-Anne Stein and Cathy Nesbitt-Stein
 Ava and Jeanette Cota
 Nicaya and Kaya Wiley (Black Patsy)
 Haley and Melanie Huelsman
 Chloe and Liza Smith
 Tara and Shari Johnson
 Zack and Gina Torres

Cast duration

Notes
 Key:  = featured in this episode
 Key:  = not featured in this episode
 Key:  = joins the Abby Lee Dance Company
 Key:  = leaves the Abby Lee Dance Company
 Key:  = returns to the Abby Lee Dance Company
 Key:  = joins The Irreplaceables
 Key:  = leaves the show entirely
 Key:  = leaves the Abby Lee Dance Company and the show entirely

Episodes

References

General references 
 

2016 American television seasons
2017 American television seasons